Daniel Judah Elazar (August 25, 1934 – December 2, 1999) was a political scientist known for his seminal studies of political culture of the US states. He was professor of political science at Bar-Ilan University in Israel and Temple University in Pennsylvania, and director of the Center for the Study of Federalism at Temple University and the founder and president of the Jerusalem Center for Public Affairs.

Biography
Elazar was born in Minneapolis in 1934. He received his M.A. and Ph.D. from the University of Chicago where he studied under renowned federalism scholar Morton Grodzins. He maintained residences in Philadelphia and Jerusalem. He was married to Harriet, with whom he had three children.

Academic career
Elazar was a leading political scientist and specialist in the study of federalism, political culture, the Jewish political tradition, Israel and the world Jewish community. As founder and President of the Jerusalem Center for Public Affairs, he headed the major independent Jewish "think tank" concerned with analyzing and solving the key problems facing Israel and world Jewry. He was Professor of Political Science at Temple University in Philadelphia, where he founded and directed the Center for the Study of Federalism, a leading federalism research institute. He held the Senator N.M. Paterson Professorship in Intergovernmental Relations at Bar-Ilan University in Israel, heading its Institute for Local Government. In 1986, President Reagan appointed him a citizen member of the U.S. Advisory Commission on Intergovernmental Relations, the major intergovernmental agency dealing with federalism issues. He was appointed for a second term in 1988 and a third in 1991. He was the founding president of the International Association of Centers for Federal Studies, Secretary of the American Political Science Association, was Chairman of the Israel Political Science Association, and was a member of various consultative bodies of the Israeli government.

Elazar was the author or editor of more than 60 books and many other publications including a 4-volume study of the Covenant Tradition in Politics, as well as Community and Polity, The Jewish Polity, and People and Polity, a trilogy on Jewish political and community organization from earliest times to the present. He also founded and edited the scholarly journal Jewish Political Studies Review. His books in the area of federalism include The American Partnership (1962); American Federalism: A View from the States (1966); The American Mosaic (1994); and Exploring Federalism (1987). He was also the author of a multi-generational study of the development of civil community in midwestern cities. The research produced Cities of the Prairie (1970), Cities of the Prairie Revisited (1986) and Cities of the Prairie: Opening Cybernetic Frontiers (2004). He was also the founder and editor of Publius, the Journal of Federalism.

Elazar was recognized as an expert on Jewish community organization worldwide, on the Jewish political tradition, and on Israel's government and politics. He was a consultant to the Israeli government, the Jewish Agency, the World Zionist Organization, the city of Jerusalem, and to most major Jewish organizations in the United States and in Canada, Europe, South Africa and Australia. He took a leadership role in numerous local and national Jewish organizations. He was President of the American Sephardi Federation, and served on the International Council of Yad Vashem.

Elazar was twice a John Simon Guggenheim Fellow, a fellow at the Katz Center for Advanced Judaic Studies, a Fulbright Senior Lecturer, and received grants from the American Council of Learned Societies, the Earhart and Ford Foundations, the Huntington Library, the National Endowment for the Humanities, and the National Science Foundation. He served as consultant to many federal, state and local agencies, including the U.S. Departments of Education, Health and Human Services, and Housing and Urban Development, the National Governors' Association, the Education Commission of the States, and the Pennsylvania Science and Technology Commission, as well as to the governments of Israel, Canada, Cyprus, Italy, South Africa, and Spain.

Honors and awards
Elazar was a member of Phi Beta Kappa. He was awarded honorary degrees from the Hebrew Union College-Jewish Institute of Religion in Cincinnati and Gratz College in Philadelphia, and received awards for distinguished scholarly contributions from the Section on Intergovernmental Administration and Management of the American Society for Public Administration, the Section on Federalism and Intergovernmental Relations of the American Political Science Association, and the Association for the Social Scientific Study of Jewry. The Federalism and Intergovernmental Relations Section of the American Political Science Association has created the Daniel Elazar Distinguished Federalism Scholar Award to recognize scholars who have made significant contributions to the field.

Political theories
Elazar authored a four-volume comprehensive work on the idea of covenant called The Covenant Tradition in Politics:.
 Volume 1: Covenant and Polity in Biblical Israel: Biblical Foundations and Jewish Expressions: The covenants of the Bible are the founding covenants of Western civilization. They have their beginnings in the need to establish clear and binding relationships between God and humans and among humans, relationships which must be understood as being political far more than theological in character, designed to establish lines of authority, distributions of power, bodies politic, and systems of law.
 Volume 2: Covenant and Commonwealth: From Christian Separation through the Protestant Reformation: The history of the covenant tradition in the Western world has, in the course of two thousand years, undergone three separations, each of which has established a stream of covenant tradition of its own: (1) the separation between Judaism and Christianity; (2) the separation between Christianity and its Reformed wing; and (3) the separation between Jewish and Christian covenantalists and believers in a secular compact.
 Volume 3: Covenant and Constitutionalism: The Great Frontier and the Matrix of Federal Democracy: "The great frontier" that began at the end of the 15th century, whereby Europe embarked on an expansion that made Europeans and their descendants the rulers of the world for 500 years, was seen as a great opportunity for beginning again, launching an unprecedented movement of migration and colonization.
 Volume 4: Covenant and Civil Society: The Constitutional Matrix of Modern Democracy: The settlement of new worlds by bearers of the covenant tradition in politics gave those settlers an unparalleled opportunity to build societies on the covenantal model or as close to it as they could.

Elazar wrote extensively about the tradition of politics in Jewish scripture and thinking. His works on the subject include: Kinship and Consent: The Jewish Political Tradition and Its Contemporary Uses, Authority, Power and Leadership in the Jewish Polity: Cases and Issues, and Morality and Power: Contemporary Jewish Views.
 Kinship and Consent: The exploration of the Jewish political tradition is predicated on the recognition of the Jews as a separate people, not merely a religion or a set of moral principles growing out of a religion. The exploration of the Jewish political tradition, then, is an exploration of how the Jews as a people managed to maintain their polity over centuries of independence, exile and dispersion, and how they animated that polity by communicating their own expressions of political culture and modes of political behavior.
 Authority, Power and Leadership in the Jewish Polity: Many Jews are finding that they express themselves Jewishly through political means, if at all, whether that entails support of Israel or other causes which then become "Jewish" causes, or through working within the political and communal organizations of the Jewish people, which increasingly are perceived for what they are, namely, means of organizing power.
 Morality and Power: In September 1988, as the intifada approached the end of its first year, a distinguished group of leaders in academic and public affairs in Israel and the diaspora was invited to participate in a symposium on the problems of relating morality and power in contemporary statecraft.

The Elazar typology of Jewish communal involvement is a typology laid out in Community and Polity: The Organizational Dynamics of American Jewry. It categorizes the degree of involvement American Jews have in the Jewish community:
 Integral Jews make up 10–13 percent. For these, Jewishness is a central focus of life and is passed through generations. Specifically, integral Jews may express their Jewishness "through traditional religion, ethnic nationalism or intensive involvement in Jewish affairs."
 Participants make up 12–15 percent. For this group, Judaism is a "major avocational interest"; they "take part in Jewish life in a regular way but whose rhythm of life follows larger society." Participants are likely to regularly attend synagogue and to be involved in different organizations, examples including participating in adult education, "fundraising for Jewish causes," or lobbying for Israel.
 Affiliates make up 30–33 percent. These are "members of Jewish organizations but not particularly active"; they may be "affiliated with synagogues but irregular attenders."
 Contributors and Consumers make up another 25–33 percent. They "periodically use the services of Jewish organizations as needed," and keep a Jewish identity but remain "minimally associated." They may on occasion contribute financially to Jewish organizations.
 Peripherals make up 25 percent. These are "recognizably Jewish but wholly uninvolved in Jewish life"; they have "no particular desire to use Jewish institutions or contribute to organizations"
 Repudiators and Converts-Out make up 2–7 percent. This group includes those who have converted to another religion and who "actively deny Jewishness."

Elazar's theories on the political subcultures in the American states, articulated in American Federalism, A View From the States have been influential and remains relevant among scholars of American politics. Elazar argues that there are three dominant political subcultures in the American states: moralistic (government viewed as egalitarian institution charged with pursuing the common good), traditionalistic (government viewed a hierarchical institution charged with protecting an elite-centered status quo), and individualistic (government viewed as minimalist institution charged with protecting the functionality of the marketplace but is otherwise not active). Elazar's theory is still routinely used as variable in academic research and is discussed in most textbooks on American state and local government.

Published works
 The American Partnership: Intergovernmental Cooperation in the United States, 1962
 American Federalism: A View from the States. 1966
 The American System: A New View of Government in the United States, edited for Morton Grodzins, 1966
 Cooperation and Conflict, Readings in American Federalism, Elazar as editor, 1969
 The Politics of American Federalism, editor, 1969
 Cities of the Prairie: The Metropolitan Frontier and American Politics, 1970
 The Politics of Belleville, 1971
 The Ecology of American Political Culture, editor with Joseph Zikmund II, 1975
 Community and Polity: The Organizational Dynamics of American Jewry, 1976
 A Classification System for Libraries of Judaica, with David H. Elazar, 1979
 Self Rule/Shared Rule: Federal Solutions to the Middle East Conflict, editor, 1979
 Federalism and Political Integration, editor, 1979
 Republicanism, Representation and Consent: Views of the Founding Era, editor, 1979
 Kinship and Consent: The Jewish Political Tradition and Its Contemporary Uses, editor, 1981
 Governing Peoples and Territories, editor, 1982
 Judea, Samaria, and Gaza: Views on the Present and Future, editor, 1982
 State Constitutional Design in Federal Systems, editor with Stephen L. Schechter, 1982
 Covenant, Polity and Constitutionalism, editor with John Kincaid, 1983
 Jewish Communities in Frontier Societies, with Peter Medding, 1983
 Kinship and Consent: The Jewish Political Tradition and Its Contemporary Uses, editor, 1983
 From Autonomy to Shared Rule: Options for Judea, Samaria, and Gaza, editor, 1983
 The Balkan Jewish Communities: Yugoslavia, Bulgaria, Greece, and Turkey, with Harriet Pass Friedenrich, Baruch Hazzan, and Adina Weiss Liberies, 1984
 The Jewish Communities of Scandinavia: Sweden, Denmark, Norway and Finland, with Adina Weiss Liberies and Simcha Werner, 1984
 Understanding the Jewish Agency: A Handbook, editor with Alysa M. Dortort, 1984
 The Jewish Polity: Jewish Political Organization From Biblical Times to the Present, with Stuart A. Cohen, 1985
 The Covenant Connection: From Federal Theology to Modern Federalism, editor with John Kincaid, 2000

See also
 Political culture of the United States

References

External links
 Biography of Professor Elazar
 Political Science Bibliography of Daniel J. Elazar
 The Daniel Elazar On-Line Library
 Memorial Site
 Daniel Elazar collection on the Berman Jewish Policy Archive @ NYU Wagner
 Center for the Study of Federalism Tributes to Daniel Elazar

American political scientists
Scientists from Minneapolis
Scientists from Philadelphia
Temple University faculty
Wayne State University alumni
1934 births
1999 deaths
20th-century American Jews
Earhart Foundation Fellows
University of Chicago alumni
20th-century political scientists